The 1964 NBA World Championship Series was the championship round of the 1964 NBA playoffs, which concluded the National Basketball Association 1963–64 season. The best-of-seven series was played between the Western Conference champion San Francisco Warriors and the Eastern Conference champion Boston Celtics. This was the Celtics' eighth straight trip to the championship series, as they won the series over the Warriors, 4–1.

This was the first time Bill Russell and Wilt Chamberlain faced off in the NBA Finals; they would do so once again in 1969. This was also the first meeting between the Celtics and Warriors in the NBA Finals; they would meet each other again in 2022 and the Warriors won the series in 6 games.

Series summary

Celtics win series 4–1

Game Summaries

Game 1

Game 2

Game 3

Game 4

Game 5

Team rosters

Boston Celtics

San Francisco Warriors

See also
 1964 NBA Playoffs
 1963–64 NBA season

References

 "1963-64 NBA Season Summary", basketball-reference.com. Retrieved March 28, 2014.

External links
 1964 Finals at NBA.com
 1964 NBA Playoffs at Basketball-Reference.com

National Basketball Association Finals
NBA
NBA
Finals
NBA Finals
Basketball competitions in San Francisco
NBA Finals
Basketball competitions in Boston
1960s in Boston
NBA Finals
NBA Finals